Sarah Lindsay Evans ( Angas; November 13, 1816 – June 6, 1898) was a 19th-century English-born South Australian pioneer and an activist in the country's temperance movement.

Early life
Sarah Lindsay Angas (alternate spelling, Angus) was born at Newcastle-on-Tyne, England, November 13, 1816. Her parents were George Fife Angas, who took a deep interest in the welfare of South Australia, and Rosetta French (1793–1867), daughter of John French (1761–1829), "Gentleman of Hutton, Essex", and Rosetta French née Rayner (1756–1836). Sarah's siblings included: Rosetta, Emma, George, John, Mary, and William.

Career
She married Henry Evans (1812-?), of Exeter, on August 8, 1837. They had five children. In 1843, during the British colonisation of South Australia, she emigrated there with her husband, settling at Evandale, Keyneton.

Evans took the pledge of total abstinence in 1870. Soon, she became so opposed to the use and manufacture of alcoholic beverages that, after her husband’s death, she had the vineyards of the estate —which had produced the notable Evandale wines— uprooted, and the huge wine cellar converted into a temperance meeting-place. The large wine vat was turned upside down and made into a platform. In the same year, she established the North Rhine Band of Hope. 

Evans interested herself in the neighbouring townships. No sooner was the township of Keyneton surveyed and laid out in allotments, than Evans bought the whole of them, and in the centre of four crossroads leading to Angaston, Sedan, Truro, and Eden Valley, erected a large temperance hotel costing . Here, only non-alcoholic beverages were dispensed.

Evans was prominently identified with temperance work in South Australia, giving her support to the South Australian Alliance and other temperance organizations. The South Australian Band of Hope and Gospel Temperance Union, recognizing the value of her counsel and help, made Evans patron of the society. So great had become her influence that nearly all the members on the church roll had become total abstainers, and nearly all the children of the Sunday school were members of the Band of Hope. She was, with Hannah Chewings, Mary Jane George, Maria Peacock Henderson, Serena Lake, and Elizabeth Webb Nicholls a trustee of the Woman's Christian Temperance Union (W.C.T.U.) when it was incorporated in 1891.

Death
Sarah Lindsay Evans died in Australia, June 6, 1898.

References

1816 births
1898 deaths
People from Newcastle upon Tyne
Settlers of South Australia
Australian temperance activists
Woman's Christian Temperance Union people
English emigrants to colonial Australia